Libyssa or Libysa (Λίβισσα), was a town on the north coast of the Sinus Astacenus in ancient Bithynia, on the road from Nicaea to Chalcedon. It was celebrated in antiquity as the place containing the tomb of the great Hannibal. In Pliny's time the town no longer existed, but the spot was noticed only because of the tumulus of Hannibal. 

The site of ancient Libyssa is located within the modern district of Gebze in Kocaeli Province, at the coast of the Gulf of İzmit, near the city of İzmit (ancient Nicomedia) in northwestern Anatolia.

References

Populated places in Bithynia
Former populated places in Turkey
History of Kocaeli Province
Hannibal